State Route 123 (SR 123) is a state highway in the Gifford Pinchot National Forest and Mount Rainier National Park east of Mount Rainier in the U.S. state of Washington.

Route description

The segment of SR 123 in the heavily forested canyon is the busiest along the road, with a daily average of 803 motorists in 2007. Still in the canyon, the roadway exits the Gifford Pinchot National Forest and enters the Mount Rainier National Park. SR 123 crosses Laughingwater Creek and passes Silver Falls and the entrance to Steve Canyon to the trailhead of the Grove of the Patriarchs Trail.

History

The history of SR 123 begins with the establishment of the Pacific Forest Reserve in 1893, which became the Mount Rainier Forest Reserve on in 1897, both included the area near the present highway. The Mount Rainier National Park was established as the fifth national park on March 2, 1907. The Mount Rainier National Forest Reserve became the Rainier National Forest in 1907 and Columbia National Forest in 1908. The northern terminus of the roadway at Cayuse Pass became  (US 410) during the creation of the United States Numbered Highways. The Columbia National Forest replaced the Rainier National Forest in 1933. Between 1946 and 1959, a ski resort operated at Cayuse Pass. In 1949, the Columbia National Forest was renamed to the Gifford Pinchot National Forest to honor a pioneer of the same name. SR 14 became  on June 20, 1967 and SR 143 became SR 123, while US 410 became . Since 1974, the Washington State Department of Transportation (WSDOT) has recorded the opening and closing dates of Cayuse Pass. The only season when the pass was not closed was between 1976 and 1977. The earliest closure was on October 7, 1996 and the earliest opening was on March 30, 1992. The latest closure was on January 4, 1990 and the latest opening was June 21, 1996. Construction started on June 21, 2007 and the road reopened on September 28, 2007.

Major intersections

References

External links
 Highways of Washington State
 WSDOT – Cayuse Pass

123
Transportation in Lewis County, Washington
Transportation in Pierce County, Washington
Mount Rainier National Park